Mycena minirubra is a species of fungus in the family Mycenaceae.

Taxonomy
The species was first described scientifically by New Zealand mycologists Greta Stevenson and Grace Marie Taylor in a 1964 publication. The type specimens were found by Taylor in May, 1961, at the Wellington Botanic Garden.

The fungus was originally classified in the section Basipedes, but since that time, Rudolph Arnold Maas Geesteranus has divided Basipedes into five new sections.

Description

The cap surface has 10–16 deep grooves that correspond to the position of the gills underneath. The flesh is thin and red. The gills have a decurrent attachment to the stem, and are distantly spaced. They are shallow, apricot in color, and occasionally forked. The edges of the gills are covered with crimson vesicles.

The spores are tear-shaped, and measure 7–10 by 3–4 μm. They are amyloid, meaning they will absorb iodine when stained with Melzer's reagent. The cheilocystidia are  flask-shaped to pin-headed, measuring 40 by 5–8 μm. The red pigment will dissolve in a solution of ammonium hydroxide.

Habitat and distribution
Like all Mycena species, M. minirubra is saprobic—feeding off the decomposing organic remains of plant matter. The mushroom was originally found growing on the fallen leaves of Elaeocarpus dentatus, a species of flowering plant in the family Elaeocarpaceae. It has been reported from the Bullock Creek Track in Punakaiki, and the Nile River Walkway.

References

External links

NZFUNGI Microscopy images

minirubra
Fungi described in 1964
Fungi of New Zealand